The following is a list of notable deaths in June 1993.

Entries for each day are listed alphabetically by surname. A typical entry lists information in the following sequence:
 Name, age, country of citizenship at birth, subsequent country of citizenship (if applicable), reason for notability, cause of death (if known), and reference.

June 1993

1
Walker O. Cain, 78, American architect.
Mauro Mina, 59, Peruvian boxing champion, heart attack.
Austin Robinson, 95, English  economist.
John Terpak, 80, American weightlifter and Olympian.

2
Tahar Djaout, 39, Algerian journalist, poet, and fiction writer, murdered.
Johnny Mize, 80, American baseball player, coach and scout.
Juan José Rodríguez, 56, Argentine football player.
Norton Simon, 86, American industrialist and philanthropist.
Frans-Jozef van Thiel, 86, Dutch politician and lawyer.

3
Werner Bochmann, 93, German composer.
Frantz Casseus, 77, Haitian-American guitarist and composer.
Joe Fortenberry, 82, American basketball player, cancer.
Alhaji Bai Modi Joof, 59, Gambian lawyer.
Carl Morris, 82, American abstract painter.
Richard Anthony Parker, 87, American egyptologist.
Yeoh Ghim Seng, 74, Singaporean politician, lung cancer.

4
Molly Drake, 77, English poet and musician.
Bernard Evslin, 71, American author, heart attack.
Georgy Millyar, 89, Soviet and Russian actor.
Erna Tauro, 76, Finnish-Swedish pianist and composer.
Eric Trist, 83, English social scientist.

5
Ida Adamoff, 82, French tennis player.
Mike Bloom, 78, American basketball player.
Dupree Bolton, 64, American jazz trumpeter.
Nello Carrara, 93, Italian physicist.
Peter Kalifornsky, 81, American writer and ethnographer.
Gabriel Preil, 81, Estonian -American poet.
George Strauss, 91, British politician.
Conway Twitty, 59, American country music singer and songwriter, aneurysm.
Wolf Graf von Baudissin, 86, German general peace researcher.

6
James Bridges, 57, American film director and screenwriter (Urban Cowboy, The China Syndrome, White Hunter Black Heart), cancer.
W. McNeil Lowry, 80, American businessman.
Mort Mills, 74, American actor (Man Without a Gun, Perry Mason, Touch of Evil).
Richard Norman, 61, British chemist.
Ioan Reinhardt, 73, Romanian football player and manager.
Peter Tazelaar, 73, Dutch resistance member and SOE operative during World War II.

7
Fabrizio Clerici, 80, Italian painter.
Don Kent, 59, American professional wrestler, leukemia.
Dražen Petrović, 28, Yugoslav and Croatian basketball player, traffic collision.
Louie Ramirez, 55, American boogaloo, salsa and latin jazz musician, heart attack.
Nils Johan Rud, 84, Norwegian novelist, children's writer, and magazine editor.
Kurt Weitzmann, 89, American art historian.

8
John Atyeo, 61, English football player.
René Bousquet, 84, French  political appointee and police chief, murdered.
Roy Henshaw, 81, American baseball player.
Sergei Javorski, 90, Estonian football player.
José Nora, 52, Spanish basketball player and Olympian.
Severo Sarduy, 56, Cuban poet, author, and playwright, AIDS related disease.
Root Boy Slim, 48,  American musician.
Prince Raphael Rainer of Thurn and Taxis, 87, German prince.

9
Arthur Alexander, 53, American southern soul songwriter and singer, heart attack.
Satyen Bose, 77, Indian film director.
Juan Downey, 53, Chilean artist, cancer.
Samuel Finer, 77, British political scientist and historian.
Alexis Smith, 72, Canadian-American actress and singer, brain cancer.
Charles E. Tuttle, 78, American publisher and book dealer.

10
Arleen Auger, 53, American soprano, brain cancer.
Les Dawson, 62, English comedian, actor, writer, and presenter, heart attack.
Francis Ebejer, 67, Maltese dramatist and novelist.
Archie Macaulay, 77, Scottish football player and manager.
Alice Reinheart, 83, American actress.
Richard Webb, 77, American actor, suicide.

11
M. C. Bradbrook, 84, British literary scholar.
Bernard Bresslaw, 59, English comic actor, heart attack.
Mikhail Chumakov, 83, Soviet and Russian microbiologist and virologist.
Karel Effa, 71, Czechoslovak actor.
Mstyslav, 95, Ukrainian Orthodox Church hierarch.
Ray Sharkey, 40, American actor, AIDS-related complications.
Milward L. Simpson, 95, American politician.
Friedrich Thielen, 77, German politician.

12
Gérard Côté, 79, Canadian marathon runner and Olympian.
Remo Galli, 80, Italian football player and coach.
Wilhelm Gliese, 77, German astronomer.
Alexander Koroviakov, 80, Soviet and Russian painter and art teacher.
Ekrem Koçak, 62, Turkish middle distance runner and Olympian.
Monte Melkonian, 35, Armenian-American revolutionary, killed in action.
Ivan Potrč, 80, Slovene writer and playwright.
Manuel Summers Rivero, 58, Spanish film director, screenwriter and actor, colorectal cancer.
Binay Ranjan Sen, 95, Indian diplomat and civil servant.
Ingeborg Weber-Kellermann, 74, German folklorist, anthropologist and ethnologist.

13
John Campbell, 41, American blues guitarist, singer, and songwriter, heart attack.
Ewald Dytko, 78, Polish football player.
Ena Gregory, 87, Australian-American actress.
Gajo Petrović, 66, Yugoslav-Croatian Marxist philosopher.
Deke Slayton, 69, American Air Force pilot and aeronautical engineer, brain cancer.

14
Étienne Borne, 86, French philosopher.
Ruggero Chiesa, 59, Italian classical guitarist, teacher and editor.
V. T. Hamlin, 93, American comic strip cartoonist.
Louis Jacquinot, 94, French lawyer and politician.

15
Marjorie Clark, 83, South African track and field athlete and Olympic medalist.
Tahirou Congacou, 80, Beninese politician.
John Connally, 76, American politician, pulmonary fibrosis.
James Hunt, 45, British racing driver and media commentator, heart attack.
Petey Scalzo, 75, American featherweight boxing champion.
Béla Sárosi, 74, Hungarian football player and manager.
Karl-Heinz Thun, 56, East German sailor and Olympic medalist.

16
Elbrus Allahverdiyev, 34, Azerbaijani Armed Forces soldier, killed in action.
Aldo Bini, 77, Italian road bicycle racer.
J. Herbert Burke, 80, American politician.
Lindsay Hassett, 79, Australian cricket player.

17
Bud Germa, 72, Canadian politician.
Angelo Longoni, 60, Italian football player.
Jean Savy, 86, French citizen and a commander in the French army.
Adolfo Winternitz, 86, Peruvian artist of Austrian origin.

18
Eva Arndt, 73, Danish swimmer and Olympic medalist.
Ben Auerbach, 74, American basketball player and Olympic medalist.
Barnabás Berzsenyi, 75, Hungarian fencer.
Brynjulf Bull, 86, Norwegian lawyer and politician.
Jean Cau, 67, French writer and journalist.
Alexandra Hasluck, 84, Australian author and social historian.
Narciso Perales Herrero, 78, Spanish politician and Falangist.
Forbes Norris, 65, American swimmer and Olympian.
Craig Rodwell, 52, American gay rights activist, stomach cancer.
Luther Tucker, 57, American blues guitarist, heart attack.

19
Jack Duggan, 82, Australian politician.
Josef Dědič, 68, Czechoslovak figure skater and sport official.
Helmut Fath, 64, German sidecar racer and engineer.
William Golding, 81, British novelist (Lord of the Flies, To the Ends of the Earth, The Inheritors), heart failure.
Abraham Kaplan, 75, American philosopher.
James Benton Parsons, 81, United States district judge
Franco Scaglione, 76, Italian automobile coachwork designer.

20
Frederick Johnson, 76, Canadian lawyer, judge, and politician.
Viktor Makhorin, 44, Soviet and Russian handball player, traffic collision.
Keith Sinclair, 70, New Zealand poet and historian.
György Sárosi, 80, Hungarian football player.

21
Colin Dixon, 49, Welsh rugby player, stroke.
Al Fairweather, 66, British jazz trumpeter.
Alan J. Gould, 95, American newspaper writer and editor.
Frank Moro, 49, Cuban-American actor, heart attack.
Kalika Prasad Shukla, 71, Indian sanskrit scholar and poet.

22
Sir William Mount, 2nd Baronet, 88, British Army officer and High Sheriff of Berkshire.
Emmett Berry, 77, American jazz trumpeter.
Rodolfo Díaz, 75, Mexican basketball player.
Victor Maddern, 65, English actor, brain cancer.
Pat Nixon, 81, First Lady of the United States (1969-1974) as wife of President Richard Nixon, lung cancer.
Bubba Phillips, 65, American baseball player.

23
Flora Bramley, 83, British actress and comedian.
Alexi Inauri, 85, Soviet and Georgian military officer.
Zdeněk Kopal, 79, Czechoslovak astronomer.
Albert Mangan, 78, American racewalker and Olympian.
Swen Swenson, 63, Broadway dancer and singer, AIDS-related complications.

24
Hans Beirer, 82, Austrian operatic tenor.
Rich Matteson, 64, American jazz artist musician.
Massimo Urbani, 36, Italian jazz alto saxophonist, heroin overdose.
Archie Williams, 78, American Air Force officer, athlete, and Olympic champion.

25
Mona Baptiste, 65, Trinidad and Tobago singer and actress.
Sergey Gorshkov, 90, Soviet lieutenant general.
Hans Hopf, 76, German operatic tenor.
Arturo Moreno, 84, Spanish comics artist and animator.

26
Roy Campanella, 71, American baseball player, heart attack.
Garo Kahkejian, 31, Armenian military commander, killed in action.
William H. Riker, 72, American political scientist, cancer.
James Thomas, 66, American blues musician and sculptor, stroke.
Willy van Hemert, 81, Dutch actor, songwriter and theatre and television director.
Ruth von Mayenburg, 85, Austrian journalist and writer.

27
Layla Al-Attar, 49, Iraqi artist, painter and activist, U.S. missile attack.
André Auville, 81, French racing cyclist.
Wolfgang Grams, 40, German member of the  terrorist organisation RAF, suicide.
Kurt Mahr, 59, German author, traffic collision.
James Trifunov, 89, Canadian freestyle sport wrestler and Olympic medalist.

28
GG Allin, 36, American punk rock musician, opioid overdose.
Gudrun Brost, 83, Swedish actress.
Boris Christoff, 79, Bulgarian opera singer.
Olga Costa, 79, Mexican painter and cultural promoter.
Dovid Lifshitz, 87, American Haredi rabbi.
Didi Perego, 56, Italian actress, cancer.

29
Antonio Badú, 78, Mexican film actor and producer.
Jimmy Fratianno, 79, Italian-American mobster and FBI informant.
Héctor Lavoe, 46, Puerto Rican salsa singer, complications from AIDS.
Patrick Lindsay, 79, Irish politician and lawyer.
Sein Win, 74, Burmese military officer and politician.

30
Leo Camera, 78, American politician.
Wong Ka Kui, 31, Hong Kong musician, singer and songwriter, cerebral hemorrhage.
Ian MacIntosh, 66, Canadian ice hockey player.
Spanky McFarland, 64, American actor (Our Gang), heart attack.

References 

1993-06
 06